Aldgate East is a London Underground station on Whitechapel High Street in Whitechapel, in London, England. It takes its name from the City of London ward of Aldgate, the station lying to the east of the ward (and the City). It is on the Hammersmith & City line between Liverpool Street and Whitechapel, and on the District line between Tower Hill and Whitechapel, in Travelcard Zone 1.

History

Original station

The original Aldgate East station opened on 6 October 1884 as part of an eastern extension to the District Railway (now the District line). The curved link to the Metropolitan Railway had to be particularly sharp owing to the location of Aldgate East station.

Resited station

As part of the London Passenger Transport Board's 1935–1940 New Works Programme, the triangular junction at Aldgate was enlarged to allow for a much gentler curve and to ensure trains that were held on any leg of the triangle did not foul any signals or points elsewhere. The new Aldgate East platforms were sited almost immediately to the east of their predecessors with one exit facing west toward the original location and another at the eastern end of the new platforms.

The new station opened on 31 October 1938  and the earlier station closed permanently the previous night. It was designed to be completely subterranean providing a much-needed pedestrian underpass for the road above. 
To achieve this task whilst still keeping the track open during the day, the bed underneath the track was excavated and the track held up by a timber trestle framework. Once excavation was complete and the new station had been constructed around the site, an army of over 900 workmen lowered the whole track simultaneously in one night using overhead hooks to suspend the track when necessary. The hooks .

The eastern exit of the new station was now close enough to St Mary's (Whitechapel Road), the next station along the line, that this could also be closed. This reduced operational overheads and journey times because the new Aldgate East had effectively replaced two other stations.

Past proposals
A campaign was launched by a local councillor in a bid to change the name of the station to Brick Lane tube station by 2012, but this had no official support and was not successful. The same councillor has also campaigned to have Shoreditch High Street railway station renamed "Banglatown".

The station today

The station has no surface buildings. A canopy was constructed in the 2000s and in 2013–14, the high-rise Aldgate Tower, was built above it. , when there was a fire in the building, the tower also contained apartments. Ticket barriers control access to all platforms.

District and Hammersmith & City line trains run into Aldgate East from Liverpool Street and Tower Hill along two sides of the above triangle and pass through the site of the earlier station, most of which has been obliterated by the current junction alignment although the extensive width and height and irregular shape of the tunnel can be observed.

The platforms have a particularly high headroom and this, combined with the late-1930s style of tiling, typical of the stations of the then London Passenger Transport Board, gives the platforms a particularly airy appearance, unusual on the Underground at the time of construction. The tiling contains relief tiles showing devices pertinent to London Transport and the area it served; these were designed by Harold Stabler and made by the Poole Pottery.

Station improvements
The station was Metronet's first (and show-piece) station refurbished in 'heritage' style. Work began at platform level in 2007. On 9 March 2007, it was noted that every other platform bullseye and its associated blue enamel "Way Out" plate below had been removed on both platforms marking the end of the only sub-surface 'New Works' station. By 14 March, all the roundels had been removed and temporary signs substituted. The north-east entrance was closed from 10 March 2007 until 2009. As of 23 May 2007, the tiling had been removed from the eastbound platform and the walls were rough cemented but the tiles remained on the westbound one. The new framework for lighting and cabling had been installed.

Services and connections

District line
This is the general off-peak frequency. During peak times trains also operate to Wimbledon. During off-peak times, 3 trains per hour from Wimbledon terminate at Barking (as of December 2014).

3 tph eastbound to Barking
6 tph westbound to Ealing Broadway
6 tph westbound to Richmond
3 tph westbound to Wimbledon

Hammersmith & City line
The typical off-peak service in trains per hour (tph) is:
6 tph eastbound to Barking
6 tph westbound to Hammersmith

It is not a regular service but before 6am, two Circle line trains run from Barking to Edgware Road via Victoria (as of February 2015).

Buses
London Buses routes 15, 25, 115, 135, 205, 242, 254 and night routes N15, N25, N205, N253 and N550 serve the station.

Nearby tourist attractions
Whitechapel Art Gallery
Petticoat Lane Market
Brick Lane
Spitalfields Market
Hamish Mackie's public artwork of six galloping horses

Notes and references

Notes

References

Bibliography

External links

 London's Abandoned Tube Stations - Aldgate East

District line stations
Hammersmith & City line stations
Tube stations in the London Borough of Tower Hamlets
Former Metropolitan and Metropolitan District Joint Railway stations
Railway stations in Great Britain opened in 1884
Railway stations in Great Britain closed in 1938
Railway stations in Great Britain opened in 1938
Whitechapel